Tuesday Night Music Club is the debut album from American singer-songwriter Sheryl Crow, released on August 3, 1993. The first two singles from the album were not particularly successful. However, the album gained attention after the success of the fourth single, "All I Wanna Do", based on the Wyn Cooper poem "Fun" and co-written by David Baerwald, Bill Bottrell, Sheryl Crow, and Kevin Gilbert. The single eventually reached number two on the Billboard Hot 100, propelling the album to number three on the US Billboard 200 albums chart. It has sold more than 4.5 million copies in the US as of January 2008. On the UK Album Chart, Tuesday Night Music Club reached number 8 and is certified 2× platinum.

It is listed as one of 1001 Albums You Must Hear Before You Die and also ranked at number 94 on the list for the 150 greatest female albums of all time by National Public Radio.

History
The title of the album comes from the name for the ad hoc group of musicians including Crow, the "Tuesday Music Club", who came together on Tuesdays to work on the album. Many of them share songwriting credits with Crow.

The front cover of the album shows Crow wearing a denim shirt with "a sheepish smile". The back cover has a neon cafe sign of the "Jenny Rose Cafe", consisting of the heart-shaped neon light behind the sign "CAFE" and above the other sign "JENNY ROSE".

The group existed as a casual songwriting collective prior to its association with Crow, but rapidly developed into a vehicle for her debut album after her arrival (she was at the time dating Kevin Gilbert, who actually co-wrote most of the songs for this album along with Crow, Baerwald, Ricketts, Bottrell, Schwartz and MacLeod). Her relationship with Gilbert became acrimonious soon after the album release and there were disputes about songwriting credits. In interviews later, Crow claimed to have written them. Both Gilbert and Baerwald castigated Crow publicly in the fallout, although Baerwald later softened his position. A similar tension arose with TMC member Bill Bottrell after her second album, on which he collaborated during the early stages.

In February 2008, Bottrell said, "The truth is hard to describe, but it lies between what all the people were shouting. It was all very vague and very complicated. She wrote the majority of the album. The guys and I contributed writing and lyrics, including some personal things. However, the sound was the sound that I developed". However, this was said while promoting their most current work together and contradicts most previous statements by him including those in Richard Buskin's highly detailed book about the situation. Bottrell in earlier times had said Crow was given the second-largest portion of the publishing splits on the album in order to motivate her to work hard, as she still had to pay the very large debt from her unreleasable real first record, publishing being the only way she was likely to earn any money from her new record.

Tuesday Night Music Club went on to sell some 7.6 million copies in the US and UK during the 1990s. The album also won Crow three Grammy Awards in 1995: Record of the Year, Best New Artist, and Best Female Pop Vocal Performance.

Travis Tritt's 2002 album Strong Enough features a song titled "Strong Enough to Be Your Man" and was written as a reply to Crow's original song.

Tuesday Night Music Club was expanded for a 2009 re-release. The 2009 deluxe edition features the original 1993 album, a second CD containing B-sides, rarities and outtakes and a bonus DVD featuring the album's six original videos plus a rare alternate version of "All I Wanna Do" directed by Roman Coppola. The DVD also includes a newly produced documentary composed of on-the-road, backstage, soundcheck and live footage from Crow's early '90s tour in support of the set. Four of the previously unreleased recordings on the bonus CD‒"Coffee Shop", "Killer Life", "Essential Trip of Hereness" and "You Want More"—were recorded in 1994 and intended for Crow's follow-up album. The cuts were mixed for this album by original "Tuesday Night Music Club" producer Bill Bottrell.
The bonus CD also includes a trio of UK single B-sides—"Reach Around Jerk", an alternate version of "The Na-Na Song" titled "Volvo Cowgirl 99" and a cover of Eric Carmen's "All by Myself"—as well as a cover of Led Zeppelin's "D'yer Mak'er" and the song "On the Outside", which was released as part of an X-Files soundtrack album.

Track listing 

Recorded live on June 6, 1994 at the Shepherds Bush Empire by GLR/BBC.
{{Track listing
| headline        = 1995 UK bonus disc Sheryl Crow Live
| title1          = Reach Around Jerk
| writer1         = Crow, Bottrell, Schwartz
| length1         = 4:48

| title2          = Can't Cry Anymore
| writer2         = Crow, Bottrell
| length2         = 4:54

| title3          = What I Can Do for You
| writer3         = Crow, Baerwald
| length3         = 7:01

| title4          = No One Said It Would Be Easy
| writer4         = Crow, Bottrell, Gilbert, Schwartz
| length4         = 6:55

| title5          = Leaving Las Vegas
| writer5         = Crow, Bottrell, Baerwald, Gilbert, Ricketts
| length5         = 6:38

| title6          = Volvo Cowgirl
| writer6         = Crow, Baerwald, Gilbert, Bottrell, MacLeod, Schwartz
| length6         = 2:30
}}

Recorded live on April 15, 1994 at the 328 Club.

Recorded live on May 1, 1995.

Deluxe edition re-release
Disc 2: B-sides, rarities and outtakes
"Coffee Shop" (Crow, Bottrell) (Previously unreleased)
"Killer Life" (Crow, Bottrell) (Previously unreleased)
"Essential Trip of Hereness" (Crow, MacLeod, Jennifer Condos, Scott Bryan, Bottrell) (Previously unreleased)
"Reach Around Jerk" (Crow, Bottrell, Schwartz) (From one of the B-sides of UK single "Run Baby Run", 1993)
"Volvo Cowgirl 99" (Crow, Baerwald, Gilbert, Bottrell, MacLeod, Schwartz) (From the B-side of the UK single "What I Can Do for You", 1994)
"You Want More" (Crow, Trott) (Previously unreleased)
"All by Myself" (Carmen, Rachmaninoff) (From one of the B-sides of UK single "Run Baby Run", 1993)
"On the Outside" (Crow, Bottrell) (From the Songs in the Key of X: Music from and Inspired by the X-Files soundtrack and the B-side of the UK CD single, "If It Makes You Happy", 1996)
"D'yer Mak'er" (Jimmy Page, Robert Plant, John Paul Jones, John Bonham) (From Encomium: A Tribute to Led Zeppelin'' and the B-side of the UK CD single "What I Can Do for You", 1995)
"I Shall Believe" (Crow, Bottrell) (New 2009 remix)

Disc 3: Bonus DVD
"Valuable Stuff": A documentary featuring on-the-road, backstage, soundcheck and live footage recorded during the Tuesday Night Music Club Tour, 1994–1995
"Leaving Las Vegas" (Crow, Bottrell, Baerwald, Gilbert, Ricketts)
"All I Wanna Do" (Cooper, Crow, Bottrell, Baerwald, Gilbert)
"Strong Enough" (Crow, Bottrell, Baerwald, Gilbert, MacLeod, Ricketts)
"Can't Cry Anymore" (Crow, Bottrell)
"Run Baby Run" (Bottrell, Baerwald, Crow)
"What I Can Do for You" (Baerwald, Crow)

Bonus video
"All I Wanna Do" (Cooper, Crow, Bottrell, Baerwald, Gilbert) (Alternate version)

B-sides

Personnel
Sheryl Crow – guitar, piano, vocals
David Baerwald – guitar
Bill Bottrell – guitar, pedal steel
Kevin Gilbert – keys, guitar, drums ("Run Baby Run", "All by Myself"), bass ("All I Wanna Do")
David Ricketts – bass guitar ("Leaving Las Vegas")
Dan Schwartz – bass, guitar
Brian MacLeod – drums
Technical
Bill Bottrell – producer
Dan Schwartz – assistant producer
Blair Lamb – engineer
Bernie Grundman – mastering
Richard Frankel – art direction
Jean Krikorian – design
Melodie McDaniel, Peggy Sirota, Scott Henriksen – photography
Sheryl Crow – liner notes

Charts

Weekly charts

Year-end charts

Decade-end charts

Certifications and sales

Awards
Grammy Awards

|-
| style="width:35px; text-align:center;" rowspan="5"|1995
|-
|rowspan="3"| "All I Wanna Do"|| Best Female Pop Vocal Performance || 
|-
| Record of the Year ||
|-
| Song of the Year || 
|-
| Sheryl Crow || Best New Artist ||

References

External links
Sheryl Crow Official website

Sheryl Crow albums
1993 debut albums
Albums produced by Bill Bottrell
A&M Records albums